() is the Irish name for a supernatural race in Celtic mythology – spelled sìth by the Scots, but pronounced the same – comparable to fairies or elves. They are said to descend from either fallen angels or the Tuatha Dé Danann, meaning the "People of Danu", depending on the Abrahamic or pagan tradition.

The aos sí are said to live underground in fairy forts, across the Western sea, or in an invisible world that co-exists with the world of humans. This world is described in the Lebor Gabála Érenn as a parallel universe in which the aos sí walk among the living. 

In modern Irish the people of the mounds are also called daoine sí; in Scottish Gaelic they are called daoine sìth (in both cases, it means "people of the fairy mound"). They are variously said to be the ancestors, the spirits of nature, or goddesses and gods.

Etymology
In the Irish language, aos sí means "people of the mounds", as the "sídhe" in Irish are hills or burial mounds (consistent with Geoffrey Keating's suggestion that the aos sí came from the Land of the Dead). In modern Irish, the word is sí; in Scottish Gaelic, sìth; in Old Irish, síde, and the singular is síd. 

By the time of the Celtic Revival, when the “Fairy Faith” became a topic for English and English-language authors, sidhe in its various forms, with various meanings, became a loanword into English and took on a variety of, often inaccurate, meanings. In a number of later, English-language texts, the word sídhe is incorrectly used both for the mounds and the people of the mounds. For example W. B. Yeats, writing in 1908, referred to the aos sí simply as "the sídhe". However sidh in older texts refers specifically to "the palaces, courts, halls or residences" of the otherworldly beings that supposedly inhabit them. The fact that many of these sídhe have been found to be ancient burial mounds has contributed to the theory that the aos sí were the pre-Celtic occupants of Ireland.

The scholar David Fitzgerald conjectured that the word sídh was synonymous with "immortal," and is compared with words such as sídsat "they wait/remain," síthbeo "lasting," sídhbuan "perepetual," and sídhbe "long life." In most of the tales concerning the sí a great age or long life is implied.

In Irish folklore
In many Gaelic tales, the aos sí are later, literary versions of the Tuatha Dé Danann ("People of the Goddess Danu")—the deities and deified ancestors of Irish mythology. Some sources describe them as the survivors of the Tuatha Dé Danann who retreated into the Otherworld when fleeing the mortal Sons of Míl Espáine who, like many other early invaders of Ireland, came from Iberia. As part of the terms of their surrender to the Milesians, the Tuatha Dé Danann agreed to retreat and dwell underground. (In later interpretations, each tribe of the Tuatha Dé Danann was given its own mound.) Geoffrey Keating, an Irish historian of the early 17th century, equates Iberia with the Land of the Dead, providing a possible connection to the aos sí.

In folk belief and practice, the aos sí are often appeased with offerings, and care is taken to avoid angering or insulting them. Often they are not named directly, but rather spoken of as "The Good Neighbours", "The Fair Folk", or simply "The Folk". The most common names for them, aos sí, aes sídhe, daoine sídhe (singular duine sídhe) and daoine sìth mean, literally, "people of the mounds" (referring to the sídhe). The aos sí are generally described as stunningly beautiful, though they can also be terrible and hideous.

Aos sí are seen as fierce guardians of their abodes —whether a fairy hill, a fairy ring, a special tree (often a hawthorn) or a particular loch or wood. It is believed that infringing on these spaces will cause the aos sí to retaliate in an effort to remove the people or objects that invaded their homes. Many of these tales contribute to the changeling myth in west European folklore, with the aos sí kidnapping trespassers or replacing their children with changelings as a punishment for transgressing. The aos sí are often connected to certain times of year and hours; as the Gaelic Otherworld is believed to come closer to the mortal world at the times of dusk and dawn, the aos sí correspondingly become easier to encounter. Some festivals such as Samhain, Bealtaine and Midsummer are also associated with the aos sí.

Alternate names in Irish folklore
The Aos sí are known by many names in Ireland, among them:
 Aingil Anúabhair: "Proud angels"
 Daoine Uaisle': "The noble folk"
 Daoine maithe: "Good people"
 Deamhna Aerig: "Air demons"
 Dream Anúabhair: "Excessively proud [people]"
 Sídhfir: "Immortal men"
 Sídheógaídhe: "Little immortals"
 Slúagh Cille:  "Host of the churchyard"
 Slúagh na Marbh: "Host of the dead"
 Slúagh Sídhe: "Immortal host"
 Slúagh-Sídhe-Thúatha-Dé-Danann: "Immortal host of the Túatha Dé Danann"
 na Uaisle: "The noble" or "The highborn"

Daoine maithe
Daoine maithe is Irish for "the good people", which is a popular term used to refer to the fairies in Irish folklore. Due to the oral nature of Irish folklore the exact origins of the fairies is not well defined. There are stories enough to support two possible origins. The fairies could either be fallen angels or the descendants of the Tuatha Dé Danann; in the latter case this is equivalent with Aos Sí. In the former case, it is said that the fairies are angels who have fallen from heaven, but whose sins were not great enough to warrant hell.

They are generally human-like, though there are exceptions such as the púca and the mermaid. The defining features of the Irish fairies are their supernatural abilities and their temperament. If treated with respect and kindness, Irish fairies can be quite benevolent; however, if they are mistreated they will react cruelly.

Types
The banshee or bean sídhe (from ), which means "woman of the sídhe", has come to indicate any supernatural woman of Ireland who announces a coming death by wailing and keening. Her counterpart in Scottish mythology is the bean sìth (sometimes spelled bean-sìdh). Other varieties of aos sí and daoine sìth include the Scottish bean nighe: the washerwoman who is seen washing the bloody clothing or armour of the person who is doomed to die; the leanan sídhe: the "fairy lover"; the cat sìth: a fairy cat; and the Cù Sìth: fairy dog.

The sluagh sídhe — "the fairy host" — is sometimes depicted in Irish and Scottish lore as a crowd of airborne spirits, perhaps the cursed, evil or restless dead. The siabhra (anglicised as "sheevra"), may be a type of these lesser spirits, prone to evil and mischief.Joyce, P.W.  A Social History of Ancient Ireland, Vol. 1, p. 271 However, an Ulster folk song also uses "sheevra" simply to mean "spirit" or "fairy".

List

 Abarta 
 Abhartach
 Alp-luachra
 Bean nighe/Caoineag
 Banshee
 Cat sìth
 Cù Sìth
 Changeling
 Clíodhna
 Clurichaun
 Dobhar-chú
 Dullahan
 Ellén Trechend
 Fachen
 Far darrig
 Fear gorta
 Am Fear Liath Mòr
 Fetch
 Fuath
 Gancanagh
 Ghillie Dhu / Gille Dubh
 Glaistig/Glashtyn
 Leanan Sídhe / Leannan Sìth
 Leprechaun
 Merrow
 Oilliphéist
 Púca
 Sluagh

The custom of offering milk and traditional foods—such as baked goods, apples or berries—to the  has survived through the Christian era into the present day in parts of Ireland, Scotland and the diaspora. Those who maintain some degree of belief in the  also are careful to leave their sacred places alone and protect them from damage through road or housing construction.

See also
Enchanted Moura
Edmund Lenihan
Ailill (Old Irish for "elf")
Fairy riding
Fir Bolg
Jinn (Arab mythical being)
Otherworld
Strontian

References

Primary sources
 Lebor Gabála Érenn (The Book of Invasions) in Lebor Laignech (The Book of Leinster)
 Annála na gCeithre Máistrí (The Annals of the Four Masters)
 Leabhar Bhaile an Mhóta (The Book of Ballymote)
 Lebor na hUidre (The Book of the Dun Cow)
 Leabhar Buidhe Lecain (The Yellow Book of Lecan)
 Leabhar (Mór) Leacain (The Great Book of Lecan)

Secondary sources
 Briggs, Katharine (1978). The Vanishing People: Fairy Lore and Legends. New York: Pantheon.
 Briody, Mícheál (2008, 2016) The Irish Folklore Commission 1935–1970: History, Ideology, Methodology Helsinki Finnish Literature Society  and Studia Fennica Foloristica 17  Retrieved on 10 April 2018
 Colum, Padraic (1967) A Treasury of Irish Folklore: The Stories, Traditions, Legends, Humor, Wisdom, Ballads, and Songs of the Irish People. New York Crown Publishers  Retrieved from Opensource via Archive.org 10 April 2018
 De Jubainville, M. H. D'Arbois and Richard Irvine Best (1903). The Irish Mythological Cycle and Celtic Mythology. Dublin Hodges, Figgis, and Company. Retrieved from Indiana University Library via Archive.org 12 October 2017
 Evans-Wentz, W. Y. (1911). The Fairy-Faith in Celtic Countries. London: Oxford University Press. Retrieved from University of California Library via Archive.org 12 October 2017 
 Gantz, Jeffrey (1981) Early Irish Myths and Sagas London, Penguin ; 
 Keating, Geoffrey ( 1866) Foras Feasa ar Éirinn: The History of Ireland O'Mahony John (Trans) New York. James B. Kirker Retrieved from Boston College Libraries via Archive.org 12 October 2017 also republished as Keating, Geoffrey ( 1902–14) Foras Feasa ar Éirinn: The History of Ireland Comyn, David and Dinneen, Patrick S. (eds.) 4 vols. London David Nutt for the Irish Texts Society. Retrieved from University of Toronto Library via Archive.org 12 October 2017 
 Keightley, Thomas. (1892) Fairy Mythology. London: George Bell & Sons, Retrieved from Project Gutenberg 15 October 2017
 Koch, John T. (2005). Celtic Culture: A Historical Encyclopedia Vol. 1 A-Celti.  Oxford. ABC-Clio.  Retrieved on 14 March 2018
 MacKillop, James (1986). Fionn Mac Cumhail: Celtic Myth in English Literature New York Syracuse University Press  Retrieved on 14 March 2018
 MacKillop, James (1998). Dictionary of Celtic Mythology. London: Oxford. .
 MacKillop, James (2005). Myths and Legends of the Celts. London. Penguin Books .Retrieved on  14 March 2018
 McAnally, David Russell (1888).Irish Wonders: The Ghosts, Giants, Pookas, Demons, Leprechawns, Banshees, Fairies, Witches, Widows, Old Maids, and Other Marvels of the Emerald Isle Boston: Houghton, Mifflin, & Company Retrieved from United States Library of Congress via Archive.org 20 November 2017 
 Monaghan, Patricia (2004)The Encyclopedia of Celtic Mythology and Folklore New York Facts on File  Retrieved on 10 April 2018
 Ó Danachair, Caoimhín (1978). A Bibliography of Irish Ethnology and Folk Tradition. Dublin Mercier Press 
 Ó Súilleabháin, Seán (1942) A Handbook of Irish Folklore Dublin Educational Company of Ireland Limited 
 Ó Súilleabháin, Seán & Christiansen, Reidar Th.(1963). The Types of the Irish Folktale. Folklore Fellows' Communications No. 188. Helsinki 1963.
 Rolleston, T.W. (1911). Myths and Legends of the Celtic Race. London. George Harrap and Company. Retrieved from Public Library of India via Archive.org 14 March 2018 
 Zipes, Jack (2015) The Oxford Companion to Fairy Tales 2nd Ed. Oxford University Press  Retrieved  10 April 2018
 White, Carolyn (2005) [1st pub.1976], A History of Irish Fairies New York. Avalon Publishing Group.  
 Irish folklore archive inscribed into UNESCO register Rte News 6 December 2017 Retrieved 10 April 2018

 Tertiary Sources
 Anonymous [C.J.T.] (1889). Folk-Lore and Legends: Ireland. London: W.W. Gibbings. Retrieved from Harvard University Library via Archive.org 21 November 2017  also republished as Anonymous [C.J.T.] (1904). Irish Fairy Tales Folklore and Legends. London: W.W. Gibbings. Retrieved via Archive.org 21 November 2017 
 Anonymous, The Royal Hibernian Tales; Being 4 Collections of the Most Entertaining Stories Now Extant, Dublin, C.M. Warren, Retrieved from Google Books on 4 November 2017 
 Browne, Frances. (1904). Granny's Wonderful Chair New York: McClure, Phillips and Company, Retrieved from United States Library of Congress via Archive.org 22 November 2017 
 Carleton, William (1830). Traits and Stories of the Irish Peasantry, First Series Vol. 1. Dublin: William Curry, Jun, and Company Retrieved from University of Illinois Library via Archive.org 11 November 2017 
 Carleton, William (1830). Traits and Stories of the Irish Peasantry, First Series Vol. 2. Dublin: William Curry, Jun, and Company Retrieved from University of Illinois Library via Archive.org 11 November 2017 
 Carleton, William (1834). Traits and Stories of the Irish Peasantry, Second Series Vol. 1. Dublin: William Frederick Wakeman Retrieved from University of Illinois Library via Archive.org 11 November 2017 
 Carleton, William (1834). Traits and Stories of the Irish Peasantry, Second Series Vol. 2. Dublin: William Frederick Wakeman Retrieved from University of Illinois Library via Archive.org 11 November 2017 
 Carleton, William (1834). Traits and Stories of the Irish Peasantry, Second Series Vol. 3. Dublin: William Frederick Wakeman Retrieved from University of Illinois Library via Archive.org 11 November 2017 
 Carleton, William (1845). Tales and Sketches Illustrating the Character, Usages, Traditions, Sports, and Pastimes of the Irish Peasantry. Dublin: James Duffy Retrieved from University of California Library via Archive.org 11 November 2017 
 Colum, Padraic (1916). The King of Ireland's Son. New York: H. Holt and Company Retrieved from Project Gutenberg via [1] 24 November 2017 
 Colum, Padraic (1918). The Boy Who Knew How to Speak to Birds. New York: The MacMillan Company Retrieved from New York Public Library via Archive.org 24 November 2017 
 Colum, Padraic (1929) [First Pub. 1919). The Girl Who Sat by the Ashes. New York: The MacMillan Company Retrieved from New York Public Library via Archive.org 24 November 2017 
 Croker, Thomas Crofton (1825).Fairy Legends and Traditions of the South of Ireland vol. 1 London: John Murray, Retrieved from Oxford University Library via Archive.org 6 November 2017 
 Croker, Thomas Crofton (1828).Fairy Legends and Traditions of the South of Ireland vol. 2 London: John Murray, Retrieved from Oxford University Library via Archive.org 6 November 2017 
 Croker, Thomas Crofton (1828).Fairy Legends and Traditions of the South of Ireland vol. 3 London: John Murray, Retrieved from Oxford University Library via Archive.org 6 November 2017 
 Curtin, Jeremiah (1890). Myths and Folk-Lore of Ireland London: Sampson Low, Marston, Searle, & Rivington Retrieved from University of Toronto Library via Archive.org 8 November 2017 
 Curtin, Jeremiah (1894). Hero-Tales of Ireland. London: MacMillan and Company Retrieved from University of Toronto Library via Archive.org 8 November 2017 
 Curtin, Jeremiah (1895). Tales of the Fairies and of the Ghost World: Collected from Oral Tradition in South-West Munster. Boston: Little Brown Company Retrieved from University of Wisconsin Library via Archive.org 8 November 2017 
 De Valera, Sinéad (1927). Irish Fairy Stories, London: MacMillan Children's Books.  Retrieved 27 November 2017 .
 Dixon Hardy, Phillip. (1837).Legends, Tales, and Stories of Ireland Dublin: P.J. John Cumming, Retrieved from Harvard University Library via Archive.org 23 November 2017 
 Dwelly, Edward (1902).Faclair Gàidhlìg air son nan sgoiltean : le dealbhan, agus a h-uile facal anns na faclairean Gàidhlig eile .. Herne Bay: E. MacDonald & Co, Retrieved from University of Toronto Library via Archive.org 29 Aug 2022
 Frost, William Henry. (1900).Fairies and Folk of Ireland New York: Charles Scribner's Sons, Retrieved from New York Public Library via Archive.org 6 November 2017 
 Graves, Alfred Perceval. (1909).The Irish Fairy Book London: T. Fisher Unwin, Retrieved from University of California Library via Archive.org 22 November 2017 
 Griffin, Gerald (1842) Tales of the Jury-Room in Three Volumes. Vol.1 London Maxwell and Co. Publishers Retrieved from University of Illinois Library via Archive.org 10 April 2018
 Griffin, Gerald (1842) Tales of the Jury-Room in Three Volumes. Vol.2 London Maxwell and Co. Publishers Retrieved from University of Illinois Library via Archive.org 10 April 2018
 Griffin, Gerald (1842) Tales of the Jury-Room in Three Volumes. Vol.3 London Maxwell and Co. Publishers Retrieved from University of Illinois Library via Archive.org 10 April 2018
 Griffin, Gerald (1827) Tales of the Munster Festivals in Three Volumes. Vol.1 London Saunders and Otley Retrieved from University of Illinois Library via Archive.org 10 April 2018
 Griffin, Gerald (1827) Tales of the Munster Festivals in Three Volumes. Vol.2 London Saunders and Otley Retrieved from University of Illinois Library via Archive.org 10 April 2018
 Griffin, Gerald (1827) Tales of the Munster Festivals in Three Volumes. Vol.3 London Saunders and Otley Retrieved from University of Illinois Library via Archive.org 10 April 2018
 Hyde, Douglas (1890). Beside the Fire: A Collection of Irish Gaelic Folk Stories. London: David Nutt Retrieved from National Library of Scotland via Archive.org 9 November 2017 
 Hyde, Douglas (1896). Five Irish Stories: Translated from the Irish of the "Sgeuluidhe Gaodhalach". Dublin: Gill & Son Retrieved from University of California Library via Archive.org 9 November 2017 
 Hyde, Douglas (1915). Legends of Saints and Sinners (Every Irishman's Library). London: T. Fisher Unwin Retrieved from University of Connecticut Library via Archive.org 9 November 2017 
 Jacobs, Joseph (1892) Celtic Fairy Tales London : D. Nutt. Retrieved from Wikisource 17 October 2017
 Joyce, Patrick Weston. (1879).Old Celtic Romances London: C. Kegan Paul and Co., Retrieved from Harvard University Library via Archive.org 22 November 2017 
 Kennedy, Patrick (1866) Legendary Fictions of the Irish Celts, London: MacMillan and Company Retrieved from National Library of Scotland via Archive.org 15 November 2017 
 Kennedy, Patrick (1870). Fireside Stories of Ireland, London: M'Glashan and Gill and Patrick Kennedy. Retrieved from University of California Library via Archive.org 18 November 2017 
 Kiely, Benedict (2011). The Penguin Book of Irish Short Stories London: Penguin Books, . Retrieved 27 November 2017 . (Traditional Irish story translated from "The Stories of Johnny Shemisin" (no Date), Ulster Council of the Gaelic League
 Leamy, Edmund. (1906).Irish Fairy Tales Dublin: M.A. Gill & Son. Ltd, Retrieved from University of Toronto Library via Archive.org 6 November 2017 
 Lover, Samuel (1831).Legends and Stories of Ireland vol. 1 Dublin: W.F. Wakeman, Retrieved from University of Pittsburgh Library via Archive.org 6 November 2017 
 Lover, Samuel (1831).Legends and Stories of Ireland vol. 2 London: Baldwin and Cradock, Retrieved from Oxford University Library via Archive.org 7 November 2017 
 MacManus, Anna (Ethna Carbery). (1904).In The Celtic Past New York: Funk and Wagnalls, Retrieved from University of California Library via Archive.org 22 November 2017 
 MacManus, Seumas. (1899).In the Chimney Corners: Merry Tales of Irish Folk Lore New York: Doubleday and McClure Company, Retrieved from New York Public Library via Archive.org 24 November 2017 
 MacManus, Seumas (1900). Donegal Fairy Stories New York: Doubleday, Page & and Company, Retrieved from Harvard University Library via Archive.org 22 November 2017 
 McClintock, Letitia (1876). Folklore of the County Donegal, Dublin University Magazine 88. Retrieved from National Library of Ireland on  15 October 2017 
 O'Faolain, Eileen (1954). Irish sagas and Folk Tales London: Oxford University Press. ; .
 O'Flaherty, Liam (1927). The Fairy Goose and Two Other Stories, London: Crosby Gaige. Retrieved 27 November 2017 .
 Scott, Michael (1988) Green and Golden Tales: Irish Hero Tales Dublin: Sphere Books Limited ; 
 Scott, Michael (1989) Green and Golden Tales: Irish Animal Tales Dublin: Sphere Books Limited ; 
 Scott, Michael (1989). Irish Folk and Fairy Tales Omnibus. London Sphere Books ; 
 Scott, Michael (1995) Magical Irish Folk Tales Dublin: Sphere Books Limited ; 
 Scott, Michael (1988). Green and Golden Tales: Irish Fairy Tales, Dublin: Sphere Books Limited,; . 
 Sheridan Le Fanu, Joseph, (5 February 1870) The Child That Went with the Fairies  All the Year Round pp. 228–233 Retrieved from Prelinger Library via Archive.org 10 April 2018 Republished in Sheridan Le Fanu, Joseph (1923) Madam Crowl's Ghost and Other Tales of Mystery James, Montague Rhodes (ed.) London: George Bell & Sons, Retrieved from Project Gutenberg 10 April 2018
 Stephens, James (1920) Irish Fairy Tales. London, MacMillan & Company, Retrieved from Project Gutenberg 5 November 2017 
 Wilde, Lady Francesca Speranza (1888).Ancient Legends, Mystic Charms, and Superstitions of Ireland London: Ward and Downey, Retrieved from Cornell University Library via Archive.org 5 November 2017 
 Yeats, William Butler. (1888).Fairy and Folk Tales of the Irish Peasantry London: Walter Scott, Retrieved from University of Toronto Library via Archive.org 20 November 2017 
 Yeats, William Butler. (1888).Irish Fairy Tales London: T. Fisher Unwin, Retrieved from University of California Library via Archive.org 20 November 2017 
 Young, Ella. (1910).Celtic Wonder Tales Book'' Dublin: Maunsel & Company LTD, Retrieved from University of California Library via Archive.org 22 November 2017

 
Fairies
Fantasy creatures
Irish folklore
Irish legendary creatures
Scottish mythology